The Sofia Open is a men's ATP World Tour 250 series tournament played on indoor hard courts. It was held for the first time as part of the 2016 ATP World Tour. The tournament takes place at the Arena Armeec in Sofia, Bulgaria.

Finals

Singles

Doubles

References

 
Tennis tournaments in Bulgaria
Indoor tennis tournaments
Hard court tennis tournaments
Sports competitions in Sofia
ATP Tour 250
Recurring sporting events established in 2016